Dale Jackson may refer to:

 H. Dale Jackson (1930–2003), Baptist minister and ethicist
 Dale Jackson (Hollyoaks), a character on the soap opera Hollyoaks

See also
 Dale Jackson Career Center, Lewisville, Texas